Only When I Laugh is the fourth album by the British pop group Blue Mink, released in 1973. It was released under the title "Blue Mink" in the U.S., Canada and New Zealand. Two singles from the album charted in the UK, “By the Devil (I Was Tempted)” at #26 and “Randy” at #9. Most of the tracks were written by Flowers, Cook and Roger Greenaway.

Track listing
All tracks composed by Herbie Flowers, Roger Cook and Roger Greenaway; except where noted.

Side 1
"Watch Out!" – 2:44
"Randy" – 3:12
"Another 'Without You' Day" (Cook, Greenaway, Steve Jameson, Marshall Doctors) – 3:44
"Daughter of Someone" – 3:50
"Together" – 4:04
"Stay With Me" – 3:12

Side 2
"By the Devil (I Was Tempted)" (Guy Fletcher, Doug Flett) – 3:38
"You Are the Sunshine of My Life" (Stevie Wonder) – 3:34
"Harlem" (Bill Withers)  – 2:41
"Lonliness" – 3:47
"Harmony" – 3:12
"Where Did They Go" (Gloria Sklerov, Harry Lloyd)  – 4:03

Personnel
Blue Mink

Madelaine Bell, Roger Cook - vocals
Alan Parker - guitar
Herbie Flowers - bass
Ann Odell, Roger Coulam - keyboards
Barry Morgan - drums
Ray Cooper - L.A. percussion

Production

Produced by: David Mackay
Recorded at: Morgan Studios, London
Engineers: Martin Levan, Paul Tregurtha
Orchestral Arrangement on "Together" - Ann Odell
Album Sleeve Art: Malcolm Livingstone, Sutterby, Stobart

References

1973 albums
Albums produced by David Mackay (producer)
EMI Records albums
Albums recorded at Morgan Sound Studios